Joseph Anthony Fernandez was the Chancellor of the New York City Board of Education, "the nation's largest school," 1990–1993.

Early life and education
Fernandez was born in Harlem, grew up there, joined the U.S. Air Force, and "earned a high school equivalency diploma;" he then went to Columbia University. Before graduating, he and his wife moved to Florida to alleviate a son's health problem. Fernandez transferred to and graduated from University of Miami.

Career

Florida
Fernandez began his teaching career in 1963 in Florida.

He eventually reached "superintendent of schools in Miami" ("head of the schools in Dade County, Florida"), a position he held for two years prior to coming to New York City.

New York City
Fernandez had a "stormy three-and-a-half-year tenure as one of the highest-paid school officials in the country." Fernandez's support of the 1991 Rainbow Curriculum for first grade multicultural education, and his support of AIDS education in public schools, were controversies that led to his contract not being renewed in 1993. His successor was the city's "sixth schools chancellor in a decade."

His suspending of an entire school board in Queens was reversed by the city's Board of Education.

Back to Florida
Following the end of his position in New York City, Fernandez and his wife  moved back to Florida.

Personal
Fernandez is "a native New Yorker" who spent "a quarter of a century in Miami." His wife's name is Lily; they have four children. The son with the health problem benefited from the move to Florida.

References

1935 births
University of Miami alumni
Living people
Columbia University alumni